Child Labor Act may refer to:

 Child Labour (Prohibition and Regulation) Act, India
 Keating–Owen Act, United States